Thomas Dundon (born September 5, 1971) is an American businessman, specializing in financial services, real estate and sports entertainment. He is chairman and managing partner of Dundon Capital Partners in Dallas, Texas, chairman of pickleball.com, and is the sole owner and chief executive officer (CEO) of the Carolina Hurricanes of the National Hockey League and was on the board of the former Alliance of American Football.

Early life and career
Dundon was born in New York and raised in Texas. He attended Southern Methodist University, where he earned a bachelor's degree in economics in 1993 and served as president of Phi Gamma Delta. He soon after operated a restaurant in Fort Worth, Texas. Later, with a number of partners, he co-founded a business focused primarily on subprime automobile financing called Drive Financial Services, LP, which eventually became Santander Consumer USA, a large U.S. consumer finance company majority held by Banco Santander. By the time he left in 2015, Dundon served as chairman and chief executive officer of the company. After leaving Santander, Dundon started his own firm, Dundon Capital Partners, and bought a 33-story building in downtown Dallas. Dundon's investments via the firm include Employer Direct Healthcare, a healthcare services company, Exeter Finance, an auto finance company, and Pacific Elm Properties, a Dallas-based real estate company. Also after leaving Santander, Dundon cofounded Trinity Forest Golf Club in Dallas.

Sports investments

Carolina Hurricanes
In late 2017, Dundon became involved in purchasing the Carolina Hurricanes of the National Hockey League from owner Peter Karmanos Jr. who had owned the team since it was the Hartford Whalers. Dundon became majority owner of the team on January 11, 2018, in a transaction where he purchased 52% of the team and the operating rights to PNC Arena for $420 million.

On June 30, 2021, Dundon completed the purchase of all minority shares in the team, leaving him as the sole owner of the Hurricanes franchise.

Alliance of American Football
On February 19, 2019, the Alliance of American Football announced a $250 million investment by Dundon and named him as a member of the board of directors. The cash infusion is believed to have saved the league from a short-term financial crisis.
Reports noted that Dundon reserved the right to end his investment at any time. 

Dundon's first publicly visible move as a member of the board of directors, was to move the AAF's championship to the Ford Center at the Star in Frisco, Texas, after meeting with Dallas Cowboys owner Jerry Jones and negotiating the change in venue. The move was an effort to align the AAF with the NFL. While the game had originally been scheduled for Sam Boyd Stadium in Nevada and ticket refunds had to be issued, the AAF's local partners were reportedly "understanding" of the venue change. 
Dundon later expressed concern for the future of the AAF if the National Football League Players Association was unable to share players. The NFLPA was reportedly reluctant share players because of injury concerns. 

The AAF suspended operations on April 2, 2019.

Pickleball
On December 27, 2021, Dundon's investment firm Dundon Capital Partners acquired Pickleball Central, the largest online pickleball retail site in the world. The acquisition also included Pickleball Central's affiliated PickleballTournaments.com software.

On October 5, 2022, pickleball.com launched, citing an investment from Dundon. The platform seeks to "bring together the data, content, and expertise" of the PPA Tour, the professional tour of pickleball, Pickleball Tournaments and Pickleball Brackets, the leaders in tournament and club software, TopCourt, a leader in online pickleball and tennis instruction, and Pickleball Central, the leading pickleball e-commerce platform.

On November 9, 2022, Major League Pickleball announced a strategic merger with the PPA Tour's VIBE Pickleball League. "Coming together as one team league allows us to build much bigger events, offer more prize money, enhance player development, pursue larger media and sponsorship deals and, most importantly, grow the game we all love", Dundon said in a joint announcement with Major League Pickleball's Steve Kuhn.

References

External links
 Dundon Capital Partners official web site
Thomas Dundon – Profile at the Carolina Hurricanes' official website

1972 births
Living people
Alliance of American Football executives
American sports businesspeople
Businesspeople from Dallas
Businesspeople from New York City
Carolina Hurricanes owners
National Hockey League owners